Yuri Muzika ( born on 10 August 1980) is a former Azerbaijani footballer.

External links
 
 Profile at klisf.info 

Azerbaijani footballers
Azerbaijan international footballers
Azerbaijani expatriate footballers
Expatriate footballers in Russia
1980 births
Living people
Association football midfielders
FC Baltika Kaliningrad players
AZAL PFK players
Shamakhi FK players
Azerbaijan Premier League players